Sélange is a  village of Wallonia and a district of the municipality of Messancy, located in the province of Luxembourg, Belgium. Nearby is the source of the River Eisch.

Population 
 697 residents in 1978
 729 residents in 1990
 793 residents at 1 June 2006

Former municipalities of Luxembourg (Belgium)
Messancy